Ascobolus is a genus of fungi in the Ascobolaceae family. The genus has a widespread distribution, and contains an estimated 61 species, most of which are coprophilous. The genus was circumscribed by Christian Hendrik Persoon in 1796.

Species
Species include:

Ascobolus albidus
Ascobolus americanus
Ascobolus asininus
Ascobolus barbatus
Ascobolus behnitziensis
Ascobolus bistisii
Ascobolus brantophilus
Ascobolus brassicae
Ascobolus brunneus
Ascobolus calesco
Ascobolus carbonarius
Ascobolus carletonii
Ascobolus cervinus
Ascobolus ciliatus
Ascobolus crenulatus
Ascobolus crosslandii
Ascobolus dadei
Ascobolus degluptus
Ascobolus denudatus
Ascobolus egyptiacus
Ascobolus elegans
Ascobolus epimyces
Ascobolus equinus
Ascobolus foliicola
Ascobolus geophilus
Ascobolus hansenii
Ascobolus hawaiiensis
Ascobolus immersus
Ascobolus leveillei
Ascobolus lignatilis
Ascobolus lineolatus
Ascobolus macrosporus
Ascobolus mancus
Ascobolus masseei
Ascobolus michaudii
Ascobolus minutus
Ascobolus perplexans
Ascobolus pezizoides
Ascobolus purpurascens
Ascobolus rhytidosporus
Ascobolus roseopurpurascens
Ascobolus sacchariferus
Ascobolus stercorarius
Ascobolus stictoideus
Ascobolus viridis
Ascobolus winteri

References

External links

Pezizales
Pezizales genera